Čiflik is a village in the municipality of Sopište, North Macedonia.

Demographics
According to the 2002 census, the village had a total of 636 inhabitants. Ethnic groups in the village include:

Albanians 634
Macedonians 2

References

External links

Villages in Sopište Municipality
Albanian communities in North Macedonia